is a classic work of Japanese literature written in the early 11th century by the noblewoman and lady-in-waiting Murasaki Shikibu. The original manuscript, created around the peak of the Heian period, no longer exists. It was made in "concertina" or  style: several sheets of paper pasted together and folded alternately in one direction then the other.

The work is a unique depiction of the lifestyles of high courtiers during the Heian period. It is written in archaic language and a poetic and complex style that make it unreadable without specialized study. It was not until the early 20th century that Genji was translated into modern Japanese by the poet Akiko Yosano. The first English translation was attempted in 1882 by Suematsu Kencho, but was of poor quality and incomplete.

The work recounts the life of Hikaru Genji, or "Shining Genji", who is the son of an ancient Japanese emperor (known to readers as Emperor Kiritsubo) and a low-ranking concubine called Kiritsubo Consort. For political reasons, the emperor removes Genji from the line of succession, demoting him to a commoner by giving him the surname Minamoto, and he pursues a career as an imperial officer. The tale concentrates on Genji's romantic life and describes the customs of the aristocratic society of the time. It may be the world's first novel, the first psychological novel, and the first novel still to be considered a classic particularly in the context of Japanese literature.

Historical context
Murasaki was writing at the height of the Fujiwara clan's power—Fujiwara no Michinaga was the Regent in all but name, and the most significant political figure of his day. Consequently, Murasaki is believed to have partially informed the character of Genji through her experience of Michinaga.

The Tale of Genji may have been written chapter by chapter in installments, as Murasaki delivered the tale to aristocratic women (ladies-in-waiting). It has many elements found in a modern novel: a central character and a very large number of major and minor characters, well-developed characterization of all the major players, a sequence of events covering the central character's lifetime and beyond. There is no specified plot, but events happen and characters simply grow older. Despite a dramatis personæ of some four hundred characters, it maintains internal consistency; for instance, all characters age in step, and both family and feudal relationships stay intact throughout.

One complication for readers and translators of the Genji is that almost none of the characters in the original text is given an explicit name. The characters are instead referred to by their function or role (e.g. Minister of the Left), an honorific (e.g. His Excellency), or their relation to other characters (e.g. Heir Apparent), which changes as the novel progresses. This lack of names stems from Heian-era court manners that would have made it unacceptably familiar and blunt to freely mention a person's given name. Modern readers and translators have used various nicknames to keep track of the many characters.

Authorship

There is debate over how much of Genji was actually written by Murasaki Shikibu. Debates over the novel's authorship have gone on for centuries, and are unlikely to ever be settled unless some major archival discovery is made.

It is generally accepted that the tale was finished in its present form by 1021, when the author of the  wrote a diary entry about her joy at acquiring a complete copy of the tale. She writes that there are over 50 chapters and mentions a character introduced at the end of the work, so if other authors besides Murasaki did work on the tale, the work was finished very near to the time of her writing. Murasaki's own diary includes a reference to the tale, and indeed the application to herself of the name 'Murasaki' in an allusion to the main female character. That entry confirms that some if not all of the diary was available in 1008 when internal evidence convincingly suggests that the entry was written.

Murasaki is said to have written the character of Genji based on the Minister on the Left at the time she was at court. Other translators, such as Tyler, believe the character Murasaki no Ue, whom Genji marries, is based on Murasaki Shikibu herself.

Yosano Akiko, the first author to make a modern Japanese translation of Genji, believed that Murasaki had written only chapters 1 to 33, and that chapters 35 to 54 were written by her daughter, Daini no Sanmi. Other scholars have also doubted the authorship of chapters 42 to 54 (particularly 44, which contains rare examples of continuity mistakes). According to Royall Tyler's introduction to his English translation of the work, recent computer analysis has turned up "statistically significant" discrepancies of style between chapters 45–54 and the rest, and also among the early chapters.

Plot

Genji's mother dies when he is three years old, and the Emperor cannot forget her. The Emperor Kiritsubo then hears of a woman (Lady Fujitsubo), formerly a princess of the preceding emperor, who resembles his deceased concubine, and later she becomes one of his wives. Genji loves her first as a stepmother, but later as a woman, and they fall in love with each other. Genji is frustrated by his forbidden love for the Lady Fujitsubo and is on bad terms with his own wife (Aoi no Ue, the Lady Aoi). He engages in a series of love affairs with many other women. These are however unfulfilling, as in most cases his advances are rebuffed, or his lover dies suddenly, or he becomes bored.

Genji visits Kitayama, a rural hilly area north of Kyoto, where he finds a beautiful ten-year-old girl. He is fascinated by this little girl (Murasaki), and discovers that she is a niece of the Lady Fujitsubo. Finally he kidnaps her, brings her to his own palace and educates her to be like the Lady Fujitsubo, who is his womanly ideal. During this time Genji also meets Lady Fujitsubo secretly, and she bears his son, Reizei. Everyone except the two lovers believes the father of the child is the Emperor Kiritsubo. Later the boy becomes the Crown Prince and Lady Fujitsubo becomes the Empress, but Genji and Lady Fujitsubo swear to keep the child's true parentage secret.

Genji and his wife, Lady Aoi, reconcile. She gives birth to a son but dies soon after. Genji is sorrowful but finds consolation in Murasaki, whom he marries. Genji's father, the Emperor Kiritsubo, dies. He is succeeded by his son Suzaku, whose mother (Kokiden), together with Kiritsubo's political enemies, take power in the court. Then another of Genji's secret love affairs is exposed: Genji and a concubine of the Emperor Suzaku are discovered while meeting in secret. The Emperor Suzaku confides his personal amusement at Genji's exploits with the woman (Oborozukiyo), but is duty-bound to punish Genji even though he is his half-brother. He exiles Genji to the town of Suma in rural Harima Province (now part of Kobe in Hyōgo Prefecture). There, a prosperous man known as the Akashi Novice (because he is from Akashi in Settsu Province) entertains Genji, and Genji has an affair with Akashi's daughter. She gives birth to Genji's only daughter, who will later become the Empress.

In the capital the Emperor Suzaku is troubled by dreams of his late father, Kiritsubo, and something begins to affect his eyes. Meanwhile, his mother, Kokiden, grows ill, which weakens her influence over the throne, and leads to the Emperor ordering Genji to be pardoned. Genji returns to Kyoto. His son by Lady Fujitsubo, Reizei, becomes the emperor. The new Emperor Reizei knows Genji is his real father, and raises Genji's rank to the highest possible.

However, when Genji turns 40 years old, his life begins to decline. His political status does not change, but his love and emotional life begin to incrementally diminish as middle age takes hold. He marries another wife, the Third Princess (known as Onna san no miya in the Seidensticker version, or Nyōsan in Waley's). Genji's nephew, Kashiwagi, later forces himself on the Third Princess, and she bears Kaoru (who, in a similar situation to that of Reizei, is legally known as the son of Genji). Genji's new marriage changes his relationship with Murasaki, who had expressed her wish of becoming a nun though the wish was rejected by Genji.

Genji's beloved Murasaki dies. In the following chapter,  ("Illusion"), Genji contemplates how fleeting life is. Immediately after the chapter titled , there is a chapter titled  ("Vanished into the Clouds"), which is left blank, but implies the death of Genji.

Chapter 45–54 are known as the "Uji Chapters". These chapters follow Kaoru and his best friend, Niou. Niou is an imperial prince, the son of Genji's daughter, the current Empress now that Reizei has abdicated the throne, while Kaoru is known to the world as Genji's son but is in fact fathered by Genji's nephew. The chapters involve Kaoru and Niou's rivalry over several daughters of an imperial prince who lives in Uji, a place some distance away from the capital. The tale ends abruptly, with Kaoru wondering if Niou is hiding Kaoru's former lover away from him. Kaoru has sometimes been called the first anti-hero in literature.

Completion
The tale has an abrupt ending. Opinions vary on whether this was intended by the author. Arthur Waley, who made the first English translation of the whole of The Tale of Genji, believed that the work as we have it was finished. Ivan Morris, however, author of The World of the Shining Prince, believed that it was not complete and that later chapters were missing.  Edward Seidensticker, who made the second translation of the Genji, believed that Murasaki Shikibu had not had a planned story structure with an ending as such but would simply have continued writing as long as she could.

Literary context

Because it was written to entertain the Japanese court of the 11th century, the work presents many difficulties to modern readers. First and foremost, Murasaki's language, Heian-period court Japanese, was highly inflected and had very complex grammar. Another problem is that naming people was considered rude in Heian court society, so none of the characters are named within the work. Instead, the narrator refers to men often by their rank or their station in life, and to women often by the color of their clothing, or by the words used at a meeting, or by the rank of a prominent male relative. This results in different appellations for the same character, depending on the chapter.

Another aspect of the language is the importance of using poetry in conversations. Modifying or rephrasing a classic poem according to the current situation was expected behavior in Heian court life, and often served to communicate thinly veiled allusions. The poems in the Genji are often in the classic Japanese  form. Many of the poems were well known to the intended audience, so usually only the first few lines are given, and the reader is supposed to complete the thought themselves, leaving the rest – which the reader would be expected to know – unspoken.

As with most Heian literature, Genji was probably written mostly (or perhaps entirely) in kana (Japanese phonetic script) and not in kanji, because it was written by a woman for a female audience. Writing in kanji was at the time a masculine pursuit. Women were generally discreet when using kanji, confining themselves mostly to native Japanese words.

Outside of vocabulary related to politics and Buddhism, Genji contains remarkably few Chinese loan words. This has the effect of giving the story a very even smooth flow. However it also introduces confusion: there are a number of homophones (words with the same pronunciation but different meanings); and for modern readers context is not always sufficient to determine which meaning was intended.

Structure

Outline
The novel is traditionally divided into three parts, the first two dealing with the life of Genji and the last with the early years of two of Genji's prominent descendants, Niou and Kaoru. There are also several short transitional chapters which are usually grouped separately and whose authorships are sometimes questioned.

 Genji's rise and fall
 Youth, chapters 1–33: Love, romance, and exile
 Success and setbacks, chapters 34–41: A taste of power and the death of his beloved wife
 The transition (chapters 42–44): Very short episodes following Genji's death
 Uji, chapters 45–54: Genji's official and secret descendants, Niou and Kaoru

The 54th and last chapter, "The Floating Bridge of Dreams", is sometimes argued by modern scholars to be a separate part from the Uji part. It seems to continue the story from the previous chapters but has an unusually abstract chapter title.  It is the only chapter whose title has no clear reference within the text, although this may be due to the chapter being unfinished. This question is made more difficult by the fact that we do not know exactly when the chapters acquired their titles.

List of chapters
The English translations here are taken from the Arthur Waley, the Edward Seidensticker, the Royall Tyler, and the Dennis Washburn translations. It is not known for certain when the chapters acquired their titles. Early mentions of the Tale refer to chapter numbers, or contain alternate titles for some of the chapters. This may suggest that the titles were added later. The titles are largely derived from poetry that is quoted within the text, or allusions to various characters.

The additional chapter between 41 and 42 in some manuscripts is called  which means "Vanished into the Clouds"—the chapter is a title only, and is probably intended to evoke Genji's death. Some scholars have posited the earlier existence of a chapter between 1 and 2 which would have introduced some characters that seem to appear very abruptly in the book as it stands.

The Waley translation completely omits the 38th chapter.

Later authors have composed additional chapters, most often either between 41 and 42, or after the end.

Manuscripts

The original manuscript written by Murasaki Shikibu no longer exists. Numerous copies, totaling around 300 according to Ikeda Kikan, exist with differences between each. It is thought that Shikibu often went back and edited early manuscripts introducing discrepancies with earlier copies.

The various manuscripts are classified into three categories:
 
 
 

In the 13th century, two major attempts by Minamoto no Chikayuki and Fujiwara Teika were made to edit and revise the differing manuscripts. These two manuscripts were used as the basis for many future copies.

On March 10, 2008, it was announced that a late Kamakura period (1192–1333) manuscript had been found in Kyoto, containing the sixth chapter, ; the manuscript was 65 pages in length. Most remaining manuscripts are based on copies of the Teika manuscript which introduced revisions in the original; this manuscript, however, belongs to a different lineage and was not influenced by Teika. Professor Yamamoto Tokurō, who examined the manuscript, said, "This is a precious discovery as Kamakura manuscripts are so rare." Professor Katō Yōsuke said, "This is an important discovery as it asserts that non-Teika manuscripts were being read during the Kamakura period."

On October 29, 2008, Konan Women's University announced that a mid-Kamakura period manuscript had been found,
containing the 32nd chapter, . The manuscript was recognized as the oldest extant copy of this chapter, dating to between 1240 and 1280. The manuscript, considered to be of the  category, is 74 pages in length and differs from  manuscripts in at least four places, raising the "possibility that the contents may be closer to the undiscovered Murasaki Shikibu original manuscript".

On October 9, 2019, it was announced that an original copy of Teika's  had been found in Tokyo at the home of the current head of the Okochi-Matsudaira clan, who ran the Yoshida Domain. The manuscript is the 5th chapter, and is the oldest version of the chapter. Blue ink common in Teika's manuscript and handwriting analysis confirmed that the manuscript was written by Teika, making it among the 5 original versions of the  known to exist.

Illustrated scrolls

This scroll is the earliest extant example of a Japanese "picture scroll": collected illustrations and calligraphy of a single work. The original scroll is believed to have comprised 10–20 rolls and covered all 54 chapters. The extant pieces include only 19 illustrations and 65 pages of text, plus nine pages of fragments. This is estimated at 15% of the envisioned original.

The Tokugawa Art Museum in Nagoya has three of the scrolls handed down in the Owari branch of the Tokugawa clan and one scroll held by the Hachisuka family is now in the Gotoh Museum in Tokyo. The scrolls are designated National Treasures of Japan. The scrolls are so fragile that they normally are not shown in public. The original scrolls in the Tokugawa Museum were shown from November 21 to November 29 in 2009. Since 2001, they have been displayed in the Tokugawa Museum annually for around one week in November. An oversize English photoreproduction and translation was published in limited edition in 1971 by Kodansha International.

Other notable illustrated scrolls of Genji are by Tosa Mitsuoki, who lived from 1617 to 1691. His paintings are closely based on Heian style from the existing scrolls from the 12th century and are fully complete. The tale was also a popular theme in ukiyo-e prints from the Edo period.

Modern readership

Japanese

The Tale of Genji was written in an archaic court language, and a century after its completion it was difficult to read without specialized study. Annotated and illustrated versions existed as early as the 12th century. It was not until the early 20th century that Genji was translated into modern Japanese by the poet Akiko Yosano.  Translations into modern Japanese have made it easier to read though changed some meaning, and has given names to the characters, usually the traditional names used by academics. This gives rise to anachronisms; for instance, Genji's first wife is named Aoi because she is known as the lady of the Aoi chapter, in which she dies.

Other known translations were done by the novelists Jun'ichirō Tanizaki and Fumiko Enchi.

Because of the cultural differences, reading an annotated version of the Genji is quite common, even among Japanese readers. There are several annotated versions by novelists, including Seiko Tanabe, Jakucho Setouchi and Osamu Hashimoto. Many works, including a manga series and different television dramas, are derived from The Tale of Genji. There have been at least five manga adaptations of Genji. A manga version was created by Waki Yamato,  (The Tale of Genji in English), and a current version by Sugimura Yoshimitsu is in progress. Another manga, by Miyako Maki, won the Shogakukan Manga Award in 1989.

Selected English translations
The first partial translation of Genji into English was by Suematsu Kenchō, published in 1882. Arthur Waley published a six-volume translation of all but one chapter, with the first volume published in 1925 and the last in 1933. In 1976, Edward Seidensticker published the first complete translation into English, made using a self-consciously "stricter" approach with regards to content if not form. The English translation published in 2001 by Royall Tyler aims at fidelity in content and form to the original text.

The major translations into English are each slightly different, mirroring the personal choices of the translator and the period in which the translation was made. Each version has its merits, its detractors and its advocates, and each is distinguished by the name of the translator. For example, the version translated by Arthur Waley would typically be referred to as "the Waley Genji".
 The Suematsu Genji (1882) – Suematsu's Genji was the first translation into English, but is considered of poor quality and is not often read today. It includes seventeen of the chapters.
 The Waley Genji (1925–1933) – Waley's Genji is considered a great achievement for his time, although some purists have criticized Waley's changes to the original. Others have criticized as overly-free the manner in which Waley translated the original text. Regardless, it continues to be well-appreciated and widely read today. When the Waley Genji was first published, it was eagerly received. For example, Time explained that "the reviewers' floundering tributes indicate something of its variegated appeal. In limpid prose The Tale combines curiously modern social satire with great charm of narrative. Translator Waley has done service to literature in salvaging to the Occident this masterpiece of the Orient." The translation omits the 38th chapter completely.
 The Seidensticker Genji (1976) – Seidensticker's Genji is an attempt to correct what were perceived to have been Waley's failings without necessarily making his translation obsolete. Seidensticker hews more closely to the original text, but in the interests of readability, he takes some liberties. For example, he identifies most of the characters by name so that the narrative can be more easily followed by a broad-based audience of Western readers. (In 2008, a 4,400-page Braille version of the Seidensticker Genji was completed. It is also available for download.)
 The McCullough Genji (1994) – A selection from ten chapters of The Tale of Genji along with selections from The Tale of the Heike, translated by Helen Craig McCullough for Stanford University Press.
 The Tyler Genji (2001) – Tyler's Genji contains more extensive explanatory footnotes and commentary than the previous translations, describing the numerous poetical allusions and cultural aspects of the tale. Tyler consciously attempted to mimic the original style in ways that the previous translations did not. For example, this version does not use names for most characters, identifying them instead by their titles in a manner which was conventional in the context of the 11th-century original text. Writing for The New York Times, reviewer Janice Nimura described it as "wonderfully evocative of the original, [but] can be difficult to follow". According to Michael Wood, Tyler's version "makes a special virtue of attending to a certain ceremonial indirectness in the way the characters address one another. The great temptation for a translator is to say the unsaid things, and Tyler never gives in to it." Machiko Midorikawa notes in a review of Genji translations that more recent translators from classical Japanese "have endeavoured to find ways of preserving more of what once seemed unfamiliar or strange to English readers".
 The Washburn Genji (2015) – Dennis Washburn's Genji separates the poems from the prose and puts interior thoughts in italics. The translation has been received slightly more controversially than Tyler's, with most criticism aimed at the perceived over-clarification of the text and addition of modern colloquialisms.

Reception and legacy
The Tale of Genji is an important work of Japanese literature, and modern authors have cited it as inspiration, such as Jorge Luis Borges who said of it, "The Tale of Genji, as translated by Arthur Waley, is written with an almost miraculous naturalness, and what interests us is not the exoticism—the horrible word—but rather the human passions of the novel. Such interest is just: Murasaki's work is what one would quite precisely call a psychological novel ... I dare to recommend this book to those who read me. The English translation that has inspired this brief insufficient note is called The Tale of Genji." It is noted for its internal consistency, psychological depiction, and characterization. The novelist Yasunari Kawabata said in his Nobel Prize acceptance speech: "The Tale of Genji in particular is the highest pinnacle of Japanese literature. Even down to our day there has not been a piece of fiction to compare with it."

The Genji is also often referred to as "the first novel", though there is considerable debate over this; other texts that predate Genji, such as the 7th-century Sanskrit , or the Greek and Roman novels from classical antiquity, such as Daphnis and Chloe and the Satyricon, are considered to be novels, and there is debate around whether Genji can even be considered a "novel". Some consider the psychological insight, complexity and unity of the work to qualify it for "novel" status while simultaneously disqualifying earlier works of prose fiction. Others see these arguments as subjective and unconvincing.

Related claims, perhaps in an attempt to sidestep these debates, are that Genji is the "first psychological novel" or "historical novel", "the first novel still considered to be a classic" or other more qualified terms. However, critics have almost consistently described The Tale of Genji as the oldest, first, and/or greatest novel in Japanese literature, though enthusiastic proponents may have later neglected the qualifying category of 'in Japanese literature', leading to the debates over the book's place in world literature. Even in Japan, the Tale of Genji is not universally embraced; the lesser-known  has been proposed as the "world's first full-length novel", even though its author is unknown.  Despite these debates, The Tale of Genji enjoys solid respect among the works of literature, and its influence on Japanese literature has been compared to that of Philip Sidney's Arcadia on English literature.

The novel and other works by Lady Murasaki are staple reading material in the curricula of Japanese schools. The Bank of Japan issued the 2000 yen banknote in her honor, featuring a scene from the novel based on the 12th-century illustrated handscroll. Since a 1 November 1008 entry in The Diary of Lady Murasaki is the oldest date on which a reference to The Tale of Genji has appeared, November 1 was designated as the official day to celebrate Japanese classics. According to Act on Classics Day, the "classics" that are honored not only include literature, but encompass a wide range of arts such as music, art, traditional performing arts, entertainment, lifestyle art including tea ceremony and flower arrangement and other cultural products.

The names of the chapters became a central element in a incense-based game called Genjikō, part of the larger practice of  Monkō popular among the nobility. In Genjikō, players must match the scents of a series of five incense samples without being told the names of said samples.

Adaptations in other media
 12th-century illustrated hand scroll, 
 1951 film The Tale of Genji by Kōzaburō Yoshimura
 1966 film by Kon Ichikawa
 1980 manga  by Waki Yamato
 1981 theatre performance run by the Takarazuka Revue
 1987 anime film The Tale of Genji by Gisaburō Sugii – covers only the first 12 chapters, while adding in some psychological motivation that is not explicit in the novel.
 1987 film 
 1989 theatre performance run by the Takarazuka Revue
 1988 manga by Miyako Maki
 2000 opera by Miki Minoru
 2001 film Sennen no Koi Story of Genji
 2009 anime series  by Osamu Dezaki
 2011 film 
 2015 theatre performance run by the Takarazuka Revue; actress Asumi Rio received the Agency for Cultural Affairs Arts Festival award for her portrayal of Genji.

See also

 the pillow book 
 The Tale of Genji Museum
 , the layered, colour-coded robes worn by female members of the Imperial court
 
 Tales of Ise
 Ghost stories
 Hagiwara Hiromichi
 Yang Guifei

Notes

Bibliography
 
    
 
 
 
 
 
 
 
 De Wolf, Charles (2014). "Glimpses of Genji Through the Looking-Glass of Language". The Transactions of the Asiatic Society of Japan. fifth series, volume 6.
 
 
 
 
 
 
 
 
 
 
 
 
 Kornicki, P. F., "Unsuitable Books for Women? "Genji Monogatari" and "Ise Monogatari" in Late Seventeenth-Century Japan", Monumenta Nipponica, Vol. 60, No. 2 (Summer, 2005), pp. 147–93, Sophia University, JSTOR
 
 
 
 
 
 
 
 
 
 
 
 
 
 
 
 
 
 Sestili Daniele (1996). Musica e danza del principe Genji. Le arti dello spettacolo nell’antico Giappone. Lucca: LIM,

External links

 The Tale of Genji – Oxford Text Archive A complete English translation of the work, free for non-commercial use, Edward G. Seidensticker's translation.
 The Tale of Genji, 1654 Library of Congress, Asian Division. The edition in the Library of Congress is a complete and well-preserved set including the complete main text (54 volumes) of Tale of Genji, also Meyasu (3 volumes, commentary on key words and phrases in the text, Keizu (genealogy), Yamaji no tsuyu (a sequel to the work by a later author), and Hikiuta (index).

 Japanese Literature – Including Selections from Genji Monogatari and Classical Poetry and Drama of Japan Contains the 1882 Suematsu translation of the first 17 chapters of The Tale of Genji, with an introduction and notes.
 The Texts of Genji Monogatari Original text, romanized version, and modern Japanese translation of The Tale of Genji at the University of Virginia Library.
 Tale of the Genji woodcuts Woodcut illustrations and accompanying excerpts at the UNESCO Global Heritage Pavilion.
 The Picture Scroll of The Tale of Genji Some scans of the Genji Monogatari Emaki (Tale of Genji Scroll). Only about half of the images are from the twelfth-century scroll; they are the darker colored, more faded images.
 The Tale of Genji A photographic guide to The Tale of Genji.
 The Tale of Genji Audiobooks Japanese reading of 7 of 54 chapters from the original text, mp3 files.
 Japan Finance Minister Announces Kyoto Coin Design with The Tale of Genji Theme The Kyoto Prefecture commemorative coin set for release in October 2008 features a scene from The Tale of Genji.
 Carving of Picture Scroll of Genji monogatari Paper carvings by Noda Kazuko reproducing the 18 extant illustrations of the 13th-century Genji monogatari emaki.
 Ohmi Gallery A nice collection of Ukiyo-e and Shin-hanga, including illustrations of The Tale of Genji by such artists as Ebina Masao and Utagawa Kunisada.
 Tale of Genji Scroll 18th century anonymous artist  Available at Dartmouth College, it covers the first 16 chapters of the tale.
 The Tale of Genji by Miyata Masayuki Paper cuts by renowned artist Miyata Masayuki.
 World Digital Library presentation of 源氏物語 Genji monogatari: Volume One, Kiritsubo. Library of Congress.  Primary source moveable type book. 1596–1615, first printed edition of the world's first great novel.
 
 Tale of Genji chapter summaries
 

 
Murasaki Shikibu
11th-century novels
Heian period in literature
Japanese novels adapted into films
Japanese novels adapted into plays
Late Old Japanese texts
Monogatari
Novels adapted into operas
Japanese novels adapted into television shows
Novels set in Japan
World Digital Library exhibits
11th-century Japanese books